"Rub You the Right Way" is a song by American singer-songwriter Johnny Gill, issued as the first single from his self-titled debut album in March 1990. The single was written and produced by James Harris III & Terry Lewis. A remixed version of the song exists with a rap verse from CL Smooth.

Composition
According to Billboard, the song is about sex, more specifically a "man who offers to use his hands wisely during a night of lovin'."

Chart performance
"Rub You the Right Way" spent one week at number one on the US Billboard Hot Black Singles chart and reached number three on the Billboard Hot 100 chart. The single also peaked at number 16 on the Billboard Dance Club Songs chart.

Weekly charts

Year-end charts

Certifications

See also
 R&B number-one hits of 1990 (USA)

References

Johnny Gill songs
1990 singles
1990 songs
Motown singles
New jack swing songs
Song recordings produced by Jimmy Jam and Terry Lewis
Songs written by Jimmy Jam and Terry Lewis